The Whistle Stop Inn is a two-story building in Chicago, Illinois, which has been the home of a variety of businesses. Built in 1889 in the Irving Park neighborhood, this place represents a type of intimate neighborhood storefront that was common but is now rare. The Whistle Stop Inn was designated a Chicago Landmark in 1990. It is at 4200 W. Irving Park Road, just off the Kennedy Expressway.

Notes

Buildings and structures in Chicago
Commercial buildings completed in 1889
Chicago Landmarks